The 2003 Girabola was the 25th season of top-tier football in Angola. The season ran from 15 February to 22 November 2003. ASA were the defending champions.

The league comprised 14 teams, the bottom three of which were relegated to the 2004 Gira Angola.

ASA were crowned champions, winning a second title in a row, while Benfica de Luanda, Desportivo da Huíla and Ritondo, were relegated.

Mateus André of Interclube finished as the top scorer with 12 goals.

Changes from the 2002 season
Relegated: Benfica do Lubango, F.C. de Cabinda and Sporting do Bié 
Promoted: Primeiro de Maio, Progresso do Sambizanga and Ritondo

League table

Results

Season statistics

Top scorers

Hat-tricks

References

External links
Girabola 2003 standings at girabola.com
Federação Angolana de Futebol

2003 in Angolan football
Girabola seasons
Angola
Angola